The Real ID Act of 2005 (stylized as REAL ID Act of 2005) is an Act of Congress that establishes requirements that driver licenses and identification cards issued by U.S. states and territories must satisfy to be accepted for accessing federal government facilities and nuclear power plants and for boarding airline flights in the United States. The requirements include verification of the personal information presented when applying for the identification document, security features on the document, and electronic sharing of databases between states. The act also made various modifications to U.S. immigration law regarding asylum, border security, deportation, and certain work visas.

Enacted in response to the terrorist attacks of September 11, 2001, the provisions regarding identification documents were originally intended to take effect in 2008, but enforcement was repeatedly delayed due to widespread opposition and refusal by many state governments to implement them. Eventually states began to comply in 2012, and enforcement began in 2014 for certain federal facilities. After numerous extensions, by 2021 all states and territories were certified as compliant except American Samoa, which remained under review. , the final and most significant phase of the implementation, regarding identification documents accepted for boarding flights, was scheduled for May 7, 2025, after being postponed many times.

Legislative history
In the United States, driver licenses and identification cards issued by the states and territories are widely used as a form of identification. Prior to the Real ID Act, each state and territory set its own rules regarding the issuance of such cards, including what documents must be provided to obtain one, what information was displayed on the card, and its security features.

In response to the terrorist attacks of September 11, 2001, the U.S. government established the 9/11 Commission to provide recommendations to prevent future attacks. In its report, issued in July 2004, one of the commission's many recommendations was to establish federal standards for identification documents. In December 2004, the Intelligence Reform and Terrorism Prevention Act (IRTPA), enacted to implement the commission's recommendations, directed the Secretary of Transportation to form a negotiated rulemaking committee with representatives from the state governments and the Department of Homeland Security, to issue regulations establishing standards for identification documents issued by the states, and prohibited federal agencies from accepting identification documents that did not conform to these standards.

In February 2005, less than two months after IRTPA was enacted, the House of Representatives passed the Real ID Act as H.R.418, introduced by Representative Jim Sensenbrenner (R-WI). The bill would repeal the provisions regarding identification documents in IRTPA, replace them with a version that would set the federal standards directly rather than in negotiation with the states, and would make various changes to U.S. immigration law regarding asylum, border security and deportation. In March, the text of the Real ID Act was appended as a rider on an omnibus spending bill, H.R.1268, the Emergency Supplemental Appropriations Act for Defense, the Global War on Terror, and Tsunami Relief, 2005, which was passed by the House. The Senate removed the Real ID Act from the bill, added sections regarding visas for workers, and passed it in April. In May, the conference report merging the bill versions, including the Real ID Act added by the House and the visa sections added by the Senate, was agreed to by both houses, and the bill was signed into law by President George W. Bush on May 11, 2005. The identification document provisions of the Real ID Act were codified as a note in 48 U.S.C. § 30301.

Although the title of the law has the term REAL ID in all capitals, it does not provide a meaning for REAL as an acronym. ID is a common acronym for identification document.

Amendments
On January 7, 2008, the Court Security Improvement Act of 2007 specified that federal judges could use their court address instead of their residential address on their identification documents for purposes of the Real ID Act.

On December 17, 2018, Congress amended the Real ID Act to remove an outdated reference to the Trust Territory of the Pacific Islands (terminated in 1994) and to clarify that citizens of its successor Freely Associated States (Marshall Islands, Micronesia and Palau) were eligible for driver licenses and identification cards when admitted to the United States.

On March 27, 2020, the CARES Act, enacted in response to the COVID-19 pandemic, extended the deadline for states to comply with the Real ID Act to at least September 30, 2021.

On December 27, 2020, the Consolidated Appropriations Act, 2021 amended the Real ID Act to accept electronic versions of identification documents, and to exempt states from requiring applicants to provide documentation of their Social Security number, such as their Social Security card. In states that chose not to require such documentation, applicants were still required to provide their Social Security number, which states would verify directly with the Social Security Administration. The amendment also repealed federal funds that the original law had provided for states to assist in their compliance.

Provisions

Identification documents
The Real ID Act prohibits federal agencies from accepting driver licenses and identification cards issued by U.S. states and territories that do not satisfy certain standards, for the purposes of accessing federal government facilities and nuclear power plants and for boarding airline flights within the United States. The standards require that:
The person applying for an identification document must provide documentation of the person's full name, date of birth, and residential address; a Social Security number or documentation that the person is not eligible for one; and documentation that the person is a U.S. national or a foreign national legally present in the United States.
The state or territory must capture a photograph of the applicant, store digital images of the documents presented by the applicant, and verify the documents directly with the authorities that issued them. For example, the Social Security number must be verified with the Social Security Administration, and the legal presence of foreign nationals must be verified with the Department of Homeland Security (DHS) through the Systematic Alien Verification for Entitlements (SAVE).
The state or territory must confirm that any existing identification document of the applicant issued by another state or territory is terminated; limit the validity of identification documents to eight years; implement background checks and fraud prevention programs for employees issuing identification documents; maintain an electronic database of identification documents issued, including driver histories and violations, and provide access to it to all other states and territories.
The identification document issued must display the person's full name, date of birth, gender, photograph, address, signature, the document number, security features, and machine-readable technology.

The Real ID regulations, issued by DHS, clarified some of the verification requirements:
Applicants must provide at least two documents showing their address, but these documents do not need to be verified further.
Birth certificates must be verified through the Electronic Verification of Vital Events (EVVE) system maintained by the National Association for Public Health Statistics and Information Systems (NAPHSIS), rather than the authority that issued the certificate.
U.S. passports and U.S. visas on foreign passports must be verified with the Department of State, but the foreign passports themselves do not need to be verified with the issuing authority.

The system used to share databases of identification documents between states and territories is the State-to State (S2S) Verification Service, supported by the State Pointer Exchange Services (SPEXS) platform, developed by the American Association of Motor Vehicle Administrators (AAMVA) with federal funds. Although the Real ID Act requires that states and territories share their databases, this requirement was not included in the DHS criteria to certify their compliance.

States and territories are still allowed to issue identification documents that do not satisfy the Real ID requirements, but in this case the document must state that it may not be accepted for federal purposes.

Immigration

Asylum
The Real ID Act increased the burden of proof for individuals applying for asylum. It authorized immigration judges to require that applicants present evidence for their asylum claim if available, in addition to their testimony, and to determine the credibility of witnesses based on their demeanor, plausibility and consistency. The law also eliminated the numerical limit on individuals granted asylum, which was previously set at 10,000 per year.

Border security
The Illegal Immigration Reform and Immigrant Responsibility Act of 1996 had provided for improvements to the border barrier near San Diego, with a waiver of two specific environmental laws, the National Environmental Policy Act and the Endangered Species Act of 1973, which could otherwise prevent construction in the area. The Real ID Act expanded this provision, allowing a waiver of any laws that could interfere with the construction. Later, the Secure Fence Act of 2006 and the Consolidated Appropriations Act, 2008 extended this provision to a much longer portion of the Mexico–United States border.

Other sections of the Real ID Act ordered some reports and pilot projects related to border security.

Inadmissibility and deportation
The Real ID Act expanded the grounds for inadmissibility and deportation of foreign nationals due to terrorist activities, including members of terrorist organizations, of groups that endorsed their activities or who had received military training from them. It also prohibited those found inadmissible from seeking judicial review of their deportation orders through habeas corpus, mandamus or other petitions.

Work visas
The Save Our Small and Seasonal Businesses Act of 2005, added to the Real ID Act during its congressional passage, allowed foreign nationals who had an H-2B visa for temporary workers in any of the previous three years to apply as returning workers without counting toward the annual limit of that visa category.

A section of the Real ID Act created the E-3 visa, a type of work visa for nationals of Australia and their dependents, with an annual limit of 10,500.

The last section of the Real ID Act allocated up to 50,000 previously unused employment-based immigration visas for new applicants to work as physical therapists, nurses, or with exceptional ability in sciences or arts.

Implementation

The Real ID Act, enacted on May 11, 2005, specified that after three years, from May 11, 2008, federal agencies would no longer accept identification documents that did not satisfy the standards. However, due to widespread opposition and refusal by many state governments to implement the provisions, the deadline was extended numerous times.

On January 29, 2008, DHS issued the Real ID regulations, specifying a gradual implementation schedule. Until May 11, 2008, states and territories would have to become compliant with the Real ID Act or request an extension, which would be valid until December 31, 2009, and they could later request an additional extension to May 11, 2011. Documents issued by states and territories that were certified as compliant or that were granted an extension would continue to be accepted, even if the documents themselves did not satisfy the standards, until December 1, 2014, for people born after December 1, 1964, or until December 1, 2017, for others. After these last deadlines, identification documents themselves would have to satisfy the standards to be accepted by federal agencies.

On March 7, 2011, DHS extended the deadline for states and territories to become compliant to January 15, 2013, but all identification documents continued to be accepted during 2013. On December 29, 2014, DHS extended the deadline for documents to satisfy the standards to October 1, 2020, regardless of age.

Enforcement based on the issuing state or territory finally began in 2014 and 2015 for accessing federal facilities, and in 2018 for boarding airline flights:
April 21, 2014: DHS headquarters at the Nebraska Avenue Complex in Washington, D.C.
July 21, 2014: areas of federal facilities and nuclear power plants accessible only to employees, contractors and guests
January 19, 2015: areas of federal facilities accessible to the general public with identification, at facility security levels 1 and 2
October 10, 2015: areas of federal facilities accessible to the general public with identification, at facility security levels 3, 4 and 5, and military facilities
January 22, 2018: boarding federally-regulated commercial aircraft (airline flights)

After the deadlines, only identification documents issued by states and territories that were certified as compliant with the Real ID Act or that were granted an extension were accepted. Between 2014 and 2018, some states and territories were not compliant and did not have an extension, resulting in their identification documents not being accepted for accessing federal facilities during some periods. However, from 2018 all states and territories were compliant or continuously maintained extensions, so their identification documents remained accepted for boarding airline flights.

Due to the COVID-19 pandemic, on April 27, 2020, the extended deadline after which identification documents would have to satisfy the Real ID Act standards to be accepted by federal agencies was again extended, by one year to October 1, 2021. On May 3, 2021, it was further extended to May 3, 2023, and on December 5, 2022, it was extended once more to May 7, 2025.

State certifications
DHS began certifying states as compliant in 2012. Adoption slowed after 2013 but increased significantly in 2018 and 2019, as the final phase of implementation approached and states were faced with potential air travel restrictions for their residents. , all 50 states, the District of Columbia and four U.S. territories were certified as compliant, and one territory was under review.

The Real ID Act requires that states and territories share their ID databases with each other, but this requirement was not included in the DHS certification criteria. The system used to share ID databases was implemented in 2015. , 38 states were participating in this system.

Document versions

Most states and territories decided to offer two versions of identification documents, one compliant with the Real ID requirements and one not compliant. The compliant version is marked with a gold or black star, a white star in a gold or black circle, a white star in a gold bear in the case of California, or a white star in a gold state map in the case of Maine and Nevada. The non-compliant version has a text stating that it is not valid for federal purposes, but it is still useful for applicants who do not have or do not wish to provide all documentation required for a compliant version.

Some states also offer enhanced driver licenses and enhanced identification cards, which are only available to U.S. nationals and may be used for international travel by land or sea. They are marked with a U.S. flag and may not have a Real ID star symbol but are also accepted for federal purposes.

Documents for boarding flights
Before boarding an airline flight in the United States, passengers must pass through an airport checkpoint operated by the Transportation Security Administration, which requires that passengers age 18 and older present an identification document. Many types of documents are accepted for this purpose:
Driver license or identification card issued by a U.S. state or territory (from May 7, 2025, only if compliant with the Real ID standards)
Enhanced driver license or enhanced identification card issued by a U.S. state
Passport of any country or U.S. passport card
DHS trusted traveler card (Global Entry, NEXUS, SENTRI or FAST)
U.S. permanent resident card or employment authorization document (I-766)
Border Crossing Card
Driver license issued by a Canadian province or Canadian Indian Status card
Photo identification card issued by a federally recognized tribe
U.S. Department of Defense identification, including for dependents
Personal Identity Verification (PIV) card for U.S. federal employees and contractors
Transportation Worker Identification Credential or Merchant Mariner Credential
Veteran Health Identification Card

Except for the first category of documents in the above list, the other documents listed remain accepted regardless of the Real ID Act.

The above list is not exhaustive. Alternative forms of identification may be accepted in special circumstances, and passengers without any acceptable identification document may still be allowed to board flights after completing an identity verification process.

Passengers under age 18 are not required to present identification at airport checkpoints.

Passengers boarding an international flight may be required to present more specific documents, such as a passport or visa, to the airline during check-in and after arrival at the destination, but they may still present any of the acceptable documents at the airport checkpoint.

Criticism
The Bush administration's Real ID Act was strongly supported by the conservative Heritage Foundation and by many opponents of illegal immigration. However, it faced criticism from across the political spectrum, including from libertarian groups, like the Cato Institute; immigrant advocacy groups; human and civil rights organizations, like the ACLU; Christian advocacy groups, such as the American Center for Law & Justice (ACLJ); privacy advocacy groups, like the 511 campaign; state-level opposition groups, such as North Carolinians Against Real ID and government accountability groups in Florida; labor groups, like AFL–CIO; People for the American Way; consumer and patient protection groups; some gun rights groups, such as Gun Owners of America; many state lawmakers, state legislatures, and governors; the Constitution Party; and the editorial page of the Wall Street Journal, among others.

Highlighting the broad diversity of the coalition opposing Title II of the Real ID Act, the American Center for Law and Justice (ACLJ), founded by evangelical Christian Pat Robertson, participated in a joint press conference with the ACLU in 2008.

Among the 2008 presidential candidates, John McCain strongly supported the Real ID Act, but Hillary Clinton called for it to be reviewed, Barack Obama and Ron Paul flatly opposed it, and Mike Huckabee called it "a huge mistake." The subsequent Obama administration opposed it.

In 2008, Cindy Southworth, technology project director for the National Network to End Domestic Violence, noted a "conundrum" in the mission "to identify people who are dangerous, such as terrorists, and at the same time, [...] in a way that keeps everyday citizens and victims safe." The National Coalition Against Domestic Violence also voiced concern about the Real ID Act.

Florida Libertarian Party chair Adrian Wyllie drove without carrying a driver license in 2011 in protest of the Real ID Act. After being ticketed, Wyllie argued in court that Florida's identification laws violated his privacy rights; this claim was rejected by a judge.

Congress
The original Real ID Act, H.R.418, was approved by the House on February 10, 2005, by a vote of 261–161. At the insistence of the bill's sponsor and then House Judiciary Committee Chair Jim Sensenbrenner, the Real ID Act was subsequently attached by the House Republican leadership as a rider to H.R.1268, a bill dealing with emergency appropriations for the Iraq War and with the 2004 tsunami relief funding, which was widely regarded as a must pass bill. The Senate passed H.R.1268 on April 21, 2005, without the Real ID Act. However, the Real ID Act was reinserted in the conference report on H.R.1268 that was then passed by the House on May 5, 2005, by a 368–58 vote, and unanimously by the Senate on May 10, 2005. The Senate never discussed or voted on the Real ID Act specifically and no Senate committee hearings were conducted on the Real ID Act prior to its passage. Critics charged that this procedure was undemocratic and that the bill's proponents avoided a substantive debate on a far-reaching piece of legislation by attaching it to a "must-pass" bill.

A May 3, 2005, statement by the American Immigration Lawyers Association said: "Because Congress held no hearings or meaningful debate on the legislation and amended it to a must-pass spending bill, the Real ID Act did not receive the scrutiny necessary for most measures, and most certainly not the level required for a measure of this importance and impact. Consistent with the lack of debate and discussion, conference negotiations also were held behind closed doors, with Democrats prevented from participating."

On February 28, 2007, Senator Daniel Akaka (D-HI) introduced the Identification Security Enhancement Act of 2007, to repeal the Real ID Act and restore the equivalent provisions of the Intelligence Reform and Terrorism Prevention Act, which provided more regulatory flexibility with state participation. Seven Democratic and Republican senators cosponsored the bill. Committee hearings were held but the bill did not advance.

A similar bill was introduced on February 16, 2007, by Representative Tom Allen (D-ME), with 41 cosponsors, all Democrats. This bill did not advance either.

A more limited bill, introduced on February 13, 2007, by Senator Susan Collins (R-ME), with four cosponsors, would have extended the deadlines for states to comply with the Real ID Act.

On June 15, 2009, Senator Daniel Akaka introduced the PASS ID Act, which would replace the Real ID Act with a similar law without some of the requirements that were considered excessive, such as the obligation to verify documents with the issuing authority and shared databases. The bill passed the Committee on Homeland Security and Governmental Affairs but did not advance further.

State legislatures
A large number of state legislatures strongly opposed the Real ID Act, before the states eventually complied with it years later.

On January 25, 2007, the Maine Legislature overwhelmingly passed a resolution refusing to implement the Real ID Act in that state and calling on Congress to repeal the law. Many Maine lawmakers believed that the law would do more harm than good, they were concerned that it would create bureaucratic problems, threaten individual privacy, that it could make citizens more vulnerable to ID theft, and it would cost Maine taxpayers at least $185 million in five years to implement all aspects of the bill. The resolution vote in the Maine House of Representatives was 137–4 and in the Maine Senate unanimous, 34–0.

On February 16, 2007, the Utah legislature unanimously passed a resolution opposing the Real ID Act. The resolution stated that Real ID was "in opposition to the Jeffersonian principles of individual liberty, free markets, and limited government", and that "the use of identification-based security cannot be justified as part of a 'layered' security system if the costs of the identification 'layer'—in dollars, lost privacy, and lost liberty—are greater than the security identification provides".

Alaska, Arizona, Arkansas, Colorado, Georgia, Hawaii, Idaho, Illinois, Louisiana, Michigan, Minnesota, Missouri, Montana, Nebraska, Nevada, New Hampshire, North Dakota, Oklahoma, Pennsylvania, South Carolina, Tennessee, Virginia, and Washington joined Maine and Utah in passing legislation opposing the Real ID Act. Similar resolutions were introduced in the District of Columbia, Kentucky, Louisiana, Maryland, Massachusetts, New York, Ohio, Oregon, Rhode Island, Texas, Vermont, West Virginia, Wisconsin, and Wyoming.

On April 16, 2009, the Missouri House of Representatives passed a bill prohibiting the state from complying with the Real ID Act, by a vote of 83–69 and 3 present. On May 13, 2009, the Missouri Senate unanimously passed the bill 43–0. Missouri Governor Jay Nixon signed this bill into law on July 13, 2009. This law was later repealed in 2017. Alaska also repealed its anti-Real-ID law in 2017.

In the 2012 Florida Legislative Session, the anti-Real-ID bill HB 109 and its Senate companion S 220 were introduced. Named the Florida Driver's License Citizen Protection Act, it would require discontinuation of several of the federally mandated provisions of the Real ID Act and destruction of copies of U.S. citizens' documents from the government database. That bill died in Transportation and Highway Safety Subcommittee on March 9, 2012.

Constitutionality
Some critics claimed that the Real ID Act violated the Tenth Amendment to the United States Constitution as a federal legislation in an area that, under the terms of the Tenth Amendment, was the province of the states. Anthony Romero, the executive director of the ACLU, stated: "Real ID is an unfunded mandate that violates the Constitution's 10th Amendment on state powers, destroys states' dual sovereignty and consolidates every American's private information, leaving all of us far more vulnerable to identity thieves".

Former Republican Representative Bob Barr wrote in a February 2008 article: "A person not possessing a Real ID Act-compliant identification card could not enter any federal building, or an office of his or her congressman or senator or the U.S. Capitol. This effectively denies that person their fundamental rights to assembly and to petition the government as guaranteed in the First Amendment".

The DHS final rule regarding implementation of the Real ID Act discussed a number of constitutional concerns raised by the commenters on the proposed version of this rule. The DHS explicitly rejected the assertion that the implementation of the Real ID Act would lead to violations of the citizens' individual constitutional rights. In relation to the Tenth Amendment argument about violation of states' constitutional rights, the DHS rule acknowledged that these concerns had been raised by a number of individual commenters and in the comments by some states. The DHS rule did not attempt to rebuff the Tenth Amendment argument directly, but said that the DHS was acting in accordance with the authority granted to it by the Real ID Act and that DHS had been and would be working closely with the states on the implementation of the Real ID Act.

On November 1, 2007, attorneys for Defenders of Wildlife and the Sierra Club filed an amended complaint in U.S. District Court challenging the Real ID Act. The amended complaint alleged that this unprecedented authority violated the fundamental separation of powers principles enshrined in the U.S. Constitution. On December 18, 2007, Judge Ellen Segal Huvelle rejected the challenge. On March 17, 2008, the attorneys filed a petition for a writ of certiorari with the U.S. Supreme Court to hear their "constitutional challenge to the Secretary's decision waiving nineteen federal laws, and all state and local legal requirements related to them, in connection with the construction of a barrier along a portion of the border with Mexico". They questioned whether the preclusion of judicial review amounted to an unconstitutional delegation of legislative power and whether the "grant of waiver authority violates Article I's requirement that a duly-enacted law may be repealed only by legislation approved by both Houses of Congress and presented to the President". On April 17, 2008, numerous amicus briefs "supporting the petition were filed on behalf of 14 members of Congress, a diverse coalition of conservation, religious and Native American organizations, and 28 law professors and constitutional scholars". The Supreme Court denied the petition on June 23, 2008.

National ID card

There was disagreement about whether the Real ID Act instituted a "national identification card" system. The new law only set forth national standards, but left the issuance of cards and the maintenance of databases in state hands; therefore, the Department of Homeland Security claimed that it was not a "national ID" system. Websites such as no2realid.org, unrealid.com, and realnightmare.org argued that this was a trivial distinction, and that the new cards were in fact national ID cards, due to the uniform national standards, the linked databases created by AAMVA, and the requirement of such identification for domestic air travel.

Many advocacy groups and individual opponents of the Real ID Act believed that having a Real ID-compliant identification might become a requirement for various basic tasks. A January 2008 statement by the ACLU of Maryland said: "The law places no limits on potential required uses for Real IDs. In time, Real IDs could be required to vote, collect a Social Security check, access Medicaid, open a bank account, go to an Orioles game, or buy a gun. The private sector could begin mandating a Real ID to perform countless commercial and financial activities, such as renting a DVD or buying car insurance. Real ID cards would become a necessity, making them de facto national IDs". However, government-issued identification was already required in order to perform some of these tasks, for example two forms of identification – usually a driver license, passport, or Social Security card – were required by the Patriot Act in order to open a bank account.

Privacy
Many privacy rights advocates charged that by creating a national system electronically storing vast amounts of detailed personal data about individuals, the Real ID Act increased the chance of such data being stolen and thus raised the risk of identity theft. The Bush administration, in the DHS final rule regarding the Real ID Act implementation, countered that the security precautions regarding handling sensitive personal data and hiring workers for this task, which were specified in the Real ID Act and in the rule, provided sufficient protections against unauthorized use and theft of such personal data.

Another privacy concern raised by privacy advocates such as the Electronic Frontier Foundation was that the implementation of the Real ID Act would make it substantially easier for the government to track numerous activities of Americans and conduct surveillance. Supporters of the Real ID Act, such as the conservative think-tank Heritage Foundation, dismissed this criticism under the grounds that states would be permitted by law to share data only when validating someone's identity.

The Data Privacy and Integrity Advisory Committee, which was established to advise the Department of Homeland Security on privacy-related issues, released a statement regarding the Department of Homeland Security's proposed rules for the standardization of state driver licenses on May 7, 2007. The committee stated that "Given that these issues have not received adequate consideration, the Committee feels it is important that the following comments do not constitute an endorsement of REAL ID or the regulations as workable or appropriate", and "The issues pose serious risks to an individual's privacy and, without amelioration, could undermine the stated goals of the REAL ID Act".

Gender
The Real ID Act requires that states and territories include an individual's gender on each driver license and identification card issued. As of 2022, all states and territories allowed individuals to change their gender on identification documents to either male or female, and many states also offered the option of gender-neutral marker X. The requirements for changing the recorded gender varied by jurisdiction, from merely a personal request to additional documentation such as a court order or proof of surgery.

Some scholars criticized the inclusion of gender markers in identification documents, pointing to the ineffectiveness of gender in confirming a person's identity or due to privacy concerns of transgender individuals.

Asylum and deportation
Many immigrant and civil rights advocates felt that the changes related to evidentiary standards and the immigration officers' discretion in asylum cases, contained in the Real ID Act, would prevent many legitimate asylum seekers from obtaining asylum. For example, scholars pointed to how the Real ID Act placed more emphasis on applicant account discrepancies to determine asylum seekers as "incredible" and discretion on additional corroboration requirements, which discounted potential trauma-related psychological and other barriers related to persecution that might affect testimony accounts. Additionally, a 2005 article in LCCR-sponsored Civil Rights Monitor stated, "The bill also contained changes to asylum standards, which according to LCCR, would prevent many legitimate asylum seekers from obtaining safe haven in the United States. These changes gave immigration officials broad discretion to demand certain evidence to support an asylum claim, with little regard to whether the evidence can realistically be obtained; as well as the discretion to deny claims based on such subjective factors as 'demeanor'. Critics said the reason for putting such asylum restrictions into what was being sold as an anti terrorism bill was unclear, given that suspected terrorists are already barred from obtaining asylum or any other immigration benefit".

Similarly, some immigration and human rights advocacy groups maintained that the Real ID Act provided an overly broad definition of "terrorist activity" that would prevent some deserving categories of applicants from gaining asylum or refugee status in the United States. A November 2007 report by Human Rights Watch raised this criticism specifically in relation to former child soldiers who had been forcibly and illegally recruited to participate in an armed group.

Environment
In 2020, the section of the Real ID Act waiving laws that could interfere with construction of the border barrier had a negative impact on the natural and cultural environment of the border area. One example was at Quitobaquito Springs in the Organ Pipe Cactus National Monument in Arizona, one of the only reliable above-ground water sources in the Sonoran Desert and home to the endangered Sonoyta pupfish and Sonora mud turtle. The spring and surrounding lands are also sacred to the Hia C-eḍ Oʼodham and Tohono Oʼodham peoples. Due to construction of the border barrier, the flow of water declined precipitously from March 2020, and threatened the cultural landscape as well as the two endangered species, along with other desert animals and plants that relied on the water.

See also
 Coalition for a Secure Driver's License
 Identity document
 Internal passport
 Internal passport of Russia
 Registered Traveler
 Secure Fence Act of 2006
 United States passport
 United States Passport Card
 Western Hemisphere Travel Initiative

References

Acts of the 109th United States Congress
Identity documents of the United States
Riders to United States federal appropriations legislation
United States federal defense and national security legislation
United States federal immigration and nationality legislation